is a passenger railway station on the Musashino Line located in Midori-ku, Saitama, Saitama Prefecture, Japan, operated by East Japan Railway Company (JR East).

Lines
Higashi-Urawa Station is served by the Musashino Line between Fuchūhommachi and Nishi-Funabashi, with some trains continuing to Tokyo via the Keiyō Line. It is located 35.4 kilometers from Fuchūhommachi Station.

Station layout

The station consists of two ground-level side platforms serving two tracks, with a third, central track for use by freight services. The platforms are connected to the station building by a footbridge. The station is staffed.

Platforms

History
The station opened on 1 April 1973.

Passenger statistics
In fiscal 2019, the station was used by an average of 28,934 passengers daily (boarding passengers only).

Surrounding area
 Urawa Higashi Police Station
 Saitama Midori Ward Office
 Saitama Gakuen University
 Urawa University
 Urawa Junior College
 Kawaguchi Junior College
 Minuma Tsūsen-bori
 Hikawa Shrine

See also
 List of railway stations in Japan

References

External links

 JR East station information 

Railway stations in Saitama Prefecture
Railway stations in Japan opened in 1973
Stations of East Japan Railway Company
Railway stations in Saitama (city)
Musashino Line